The Vietnam People's Army has the following military regions:
 High Command of Capital Hanoi: It is directly under the Ministry of Defense of Vietnam; tasked to organize, build, manage and command armed forces defending the capital. The headquarters is in Hanoi.
 1st Military Region: It is directly under the Ministry of Defense of Vietnam; tasked to protect against foreign invaders; and to organize, build, manage and command forces in northeastern Vietnam. The headquarters is in Thai Nguyen.
 2nd Military Region: It is directly under the Ministry of Defense of Vietnam; tasked to organize, build, manage and command armed forces defending northwestern Vietnam. The headquarters is in Viet Tri.
 3rd Military Region: It is directly under the Ministry of Defense of Vietnam; tasked to organize, build, manage and command armed forces defending the Red River Delta area. The headquarters is in Hai Phong.
 4th Military Region: It is directly under the Ministry of Defense of Vietnam; tasked to organize, build, manage and command armed forces defending north central Vietnam. The headquarters is in Vinh.
 5th Military Region: It is directly under the Ministry of Defense of Vietnam; tasked to organize, build, manage and command armed forces defending south central Vietnam, including the western highlands and south central coastal provinces. The headquarters is in Da Nang.
 7th Military Region: It is directly under the Ministry of Defense of Vietnam; tasked to organize, build, manage and command armed forces defending southeastern Vietnam. The headquarters is in Ho Chi Minh City.
 9th Military Region: It is directly under the Ministry of Defense of Vietnam; tasked to organize, build, manage and command armed forces defending the Mekong Delta. The headquarters is in Cần Thơ

References

Military regions of the People's Army of Vietnam